Myagrus hynesi is a species of beetle in the family Cerambycidae, and the type species of its genus. It was described by Francis Polkinghorne Pascoe in 1878. It is known from Borneo, India, Sumatra and Malaysia.

References

Lamiini
Beetles described in 1878